Thunag is a tehsil in the Mandi District of Himachal Pradesh.

Tehsils of Himachal Pradesh
Geography of Mandi district